Giuseppe Santarelli (1710–1790) was an Italian castrato, composer, choir conductor, voice teacher, and Roman Catholic priest. He was named a knight of the Sovereign Military Order of Malta.

Life and career
Born in Forlì, he entered a monastery in the Order of Saint Augustine at a young age where he was eventually ordained. The exact details of his musical training are unknown, although it is clear he must have been thoroughly trained in music composition, music theory, and in singing. He was active on the opera stage in Venice during the 1740s. In 1749 he became a singer in the Sistine Chapel Choir in Vatican City, ultimately being appointed conductor in 1770. He was also for many years the cantor at the Basilica di Santa Maria Maggiore. In 1761 he published an essay on the organisation of the Sistine Chapel Choir, under the title: Informazione del Cantor Fra' Giuseppe Santarelli Cappellano d'onore dell'Eminentissimo e Reverendissimo Signor Cardinale Alessandro Albani come Ministro Plenipotenziario delle Loro MM. Imp. e Reali presso la S. Sede. In risposta ad un Biglietto di esso Eminentissimo (Roma, Komarek). As a teacher of singing his notable pupils included Muzio Clementi and Venanzio Rauzzini. His compositions consist entirely of choral works.

In 1770 Santarelli met the English music historian Charles Burney who was touring France and Italy in 1770–1771. Burney was highly impressed by Santarelli's musical abilities, and the two men became friends. Santarelli used his influence to get Burney access to the Papal Music Archive, which proved invaluable for Burney's books The Present State of Music in France and Italy (1771) and History of Music (1776). 
 
He died in Rome.

Works
Alessandro nell'Indie (1754)
Della musica del santuario, e della disciplina de' suoi cantori, 1756

Notes

Sources
"Giuseppe Santarelli", 400 lettres de musiciens: au Musée royal de Mariemont by Malou Haine, Musée royal de Mariemont, page 78.
"Sistine Choir", Grove's dictionary of music and musicians, Volume 4, page 475
Giuseppe Santarelli at operissimo.com
A new chronology of Venetian opera and related genres, 1660–1760 by Eleanor Selfridge-Field, pages 467, 483, and 506.

1710 births
1790 deaths
Castrati
Italian opera singers
18th-century Italian Roman Catholic priests
People from Forlì
Knights of Malta
18th-century composers
18th-century male musicians
18th-century Italian composers
Italian male composers